The Farkhad Dam (also known as Dam-16) is a hydroelectric and irrigation dam on the  Spitamen in Sughd Province, Tajikistan.  It is a part of the Naryn-Syr Darya Cascade.  The dam is located on the territory of Tajikistan and controlled by Tajikistan, while the Farkhad hydropower station, operated by Uzbekenergo.

History 
Construction of the Farkhad Dam was initiated in 1942 during World War II. Its architect was Joseph Karakis and it was constructed by Farhadstroy. Construction works were mainly carried out by German and Japanese war prisoners. On 18 February 1948, the first generating unit was commissioned and construction was completed in 1949. In 1959, power stations two hydraulic units were upgraded.

In 1933, the dam's and reservoir's territory was rented by Tajik SSR to Uzbek SSR for 40 years. However, it remained under Uzbek control until 2002 when Tajikistan took control over this as a result of а military operation.

Description
Hydroelectric power station is a complex of structures located within .

Installed capacity of the power station is 126 MW and the average annual generation is 830 GWh. It consist of four Kaplan turbines: two by30 MW capacity and two by 33 MW capacity.

See also

Kayrakkum Dam – upstream
Chardara Dam – downstream

References

Dams in Uzbekistan
Dams in Tajikistan
Hydroelectric power stations in Uzbekistan
Hydroelectric power stations in Tajikistan
Hydroelectric power stations built in the Soviet Union
Tajikistan–Uzbekistan border
Territorial disputes
Dams completed in 1948
Dams on the Syr Darya River